Byreddy Rajasekhar Reddy (born 1954) is an Indian politician and founder of Rayalaseema Parirakshana Samithi, for separate statehood for Rayalaseema region of Andhra Pradesh.

Early life and education
He was born in Muchumarri village, Pagidyal mandal in Nandikotkur,  Kurnool district, Andhra Pradesh to Byreddy Seshasayana Reddy and late Srimati Susheelamma. Shree Seshasayana Reddy was a three time MLA and he also served as an MLC. Rajasekhar Reddy studied at Badruka College, Hyderabad affiliated to Osmania University (B.Com 1972–75) and he did M.Com at Sir CR Reddy College, Eluru, West Godavari District AP.

Career
He was an MLA & Cabinet Minister from Nandikotkur constituency in 1994 and 1999 with Telugu Desam Party. He lost election in 2004 and 2009 general elections.

Rayalaseema Parirakshana Samithi
He quit TDP in September 2012 and formed Rayalaseema Parirakshana Samithi (RPS). He has been opposing the bifurcation of the state, and is demanding separate Rayalseema, in case Telangana statehood is granted.

He did various programmes to bring into focus the problems of Rayalaseema. He undertook a 4-month-long Tractor Yatra across the region, covering over 3000 kilometers.

He started ground-level (village level) Bus YATRA program to bring into focus the problems of Rayalaseema from February 2016.

He is launching a political outfit soon in Tirupathi.

References

Living people
Telugu Desam Party politicians
People from Kurnool
1957 births
People from Rayalaseema
Indian National Congress politicians from Andhra Pradesh